Felix Naim is an Israeli former football player and currently the manager of Hapoel Afula.

Sports career
Naim was a handball player who played for Maccabi Kiryat Motzkin and for the Israel U-18 team. He turned into football when he was 18 years old when he started to play for HaTzair Haifa youth team and then moved to play for the senior side of Maccabi Neve Sha'anan, there he played with Eli Guttman. He moved to France there he played a bit in the fifth tier.

From 1997 til 2001 he worked as Guttman's scout, Naim was the one who brought Đovani Roso to play in Israel. Later on Naim stopped working for Guttman and decided to start his career as a manager in clubs from the lower divisions in Israel.

Honours
Liga Alef
Winner (1): 2013-14
Liga Leumit
Runner-up (1): 2014–15

References

1960 births
Living people
Israeli Jews
Footballers from Haifa
Israeli football managers
Hapoel Afula F.C. managers
Ahva Arraba F.C. managers
Hapoel Kfar Saba F.C. managers
Hapoel Petah Tikva F.C. managers
Bnei Sakhnin F.C. managers
Israeli Premier League managers
Israeli people of French-Jewish descent
Association footballers not categorized by position
Association football players not categorized by nationality